BRM Costruções Aeronáuticas is a Portuguese aircraft manufacturer based in Pêro Pinheiro, Sintra. The company specializes in the design and manufacture of ultralight aircraft in the form kits for amateur construction and ready-to-fly aircraft for the European Fédération Aéronautique Internationale microlight category.

The company is noted as one of very few light aircraft manufacturers located in Portugal, a country not known for aircraft production.

BRM's aircraft are built with aluminium sheet "all-metal" construction. The company's first light two-seat STOL design was the BRM Okavango, which was superseded by the BRM Land Africa. The BRM Citius is an improved model, with a higher cruise speed. The company also produces a low-wing design, the two-seat BRM Argos.

Chris Heintz, the designer of the Zenith STOL CH 701 considers the Land Africa an unauthorized copy of the CH 701.

Aircraft

References

External links

Aircraft manufacturers of Portugal
Ultralight aircraft
Homebuilt aircraft
Portuguese brands